End of the World Party (Just in Case) is an album released by Medeski Martin & Wood.

Track listing
 "Anonymous Skulls" – 4:24
 "End of the World Party" – 5:11
 "Reflector" – 4:11
 "Bloody Oil" – 4:42
 "New Planet" – 4:07
 "Mami Gato" – 4:10
 "Shine It" – 4:59
 "Curtis" – 4:38
 "Ice" – 4:33
 "Sasa" – 4:16
 "Midnight Poppies/Crooked Birds" – 3:44
 "Queen Bee" – 4:58
 "Whiney Bitches" (Vinyl and iTunes Bonus Track) – 3:08

Personnel
John Medeski – keyboards
Billy Martin – drums, percussion
Chris Wood – basses
Marc Ribot – guitar on tracks 3, 5, 10, 12
Steven Bernstein – slide trumpet on track 10
Briggan Krauss – saxophone on track 10

References

2004 albums
Blue Note Records albums
Medeski Martin & Wood albums
Avant-garde jazz albums
Post-bop albums
Albums produced by John King (record producer)